The Wianno Club is a historic club at 107 Sea View Avenue in Osterville, Massachusetts.  The club began as the Cotocheset House, a Shingle-style structure built in 1882 on the site of a grander hotel that burned down in 1881.  This hotel was the centerpiece of a major resort development for the wealthy that was mostly developed prior to World War I.  In 1916 the newly founded club purchased the hotel property.  The club built a nine-hole golf course on the original land purchase now occupied by holes numbered 13-18. The 16th was the first hole, and the Swan residence behind the hole was built as the original clubhouse. Additional land was assembled on the west side of Parker Road and north of West Bay Road and in 1919, Donald Ross was hired to redesign the original nine and to create a new nine.

The main clubhouse was listed on the National Register of Historic Places in 1979, as one of a very few surviving 19th-century hotel buildings, and is the centerpiece of the Wianno Historic District.  It is a large three-story Shingle style building, with a variety of cross gables, projecting sections and porches typical of the style.  A single-story wing was added to the northeast after the club took the building over, and a Colonial Revival porch was added in the 1920s.  Its interiors contain much original detail.  The club has also taken over the neighboring Tiffany Cottage as a guest house.  Former chief justice of the United States Supreme Court Charles Evans Hughes died there.

See also
National Register of Historic Places listings in Barnstable County, Massachusetts

References

External links
Wianno Club Website

1887 establishments in Massachusetts
Buildings and structures completed in 1887
Buildings and structures in Barnstable, Massachusetts
Clubhouses on the National Register of Historic Places in Massachusetts
Historic district contributing properties in Massachusetts
Golf clubs and courses in Massachusetts
National Register of Historic Places in Barnstable County, Massachusetts
Shingle Style architecture in Massachusetts